The 1953 Latin Cup was the fifth edition of the annual Latin Cup which was played by clubs of the Southwest European nations of France, Italy, Portugal, and Spain. The tournament was hosted by Portugal, and the French club Stade de Reims was the winner of the tournament after defeating AC Milan by a score of 3–0 in the final match.

Participating teams

Venues 

The host of the tournament was Portugal, and the four matches were played across two stadiums in two cities.

Tournament

Bracket

Semifinals

Third place match

Final

Goalscorers

Notes

References

External links 

 Latin Cup (Full Results) from RSSSF

Latin Cup
International association football competitions hosted by Portugal
June 1953 sports events in Europe